Lignumvitae Key Botanical State Park is a Florida State Park located on  Lignumvitae Key, one mile west of U.S. 1 (Overseas Highway) at mile marker 78.5, and can be reached only by private boat or tour boat.

The park was also added to the National Register of Historic Places on February 16, 1999, under the designation of Lignumvitae Key Archeological and Historical District. According to the National Register, it contains 3 historic buildings, 3 structures and 8 objects.

Flora
Tropical hardwood hammocks dominate the key. Trees found on the island include Holywood Lignum-vitae (Guaiacum sanctum), False Mastic (Sideroxylon foetidissimum), Florida Strangler Fig (Ficus aurea), Poisonwood (Metopium toxiferum), Pigeonplum (Coccoloba diversifolia) and Gumbo-limbo (Bursera simaruba).

Fauna
Among the park's wildlife are a variety of shore, wading and migratory birds.

History
The key has also been known at various times as Cayo de la lena, Jenkinson Key, Lignum Vita Kay and Lignum Vitae Kay.

A wealthy chemist from Miami, William John Matheson, bought the island in 1919. He built a small home, with a windmill to supply power and a cistern to capture fresh rainwater. The renovated building is now the visitor center for the park.

Activities
Hour-long guided walks occur twice daily, Friday - Sunday.
There is no fishing or swimming allowed off the dock or within 100 feet of it.
No more than 50 people are permitted on the Key at one time - 25 on the trail and 25 in the clearing. Visitors are warned to bring shoes and mosquito repellent.

Hours
The park is open from 8:00 a.m. till 5:00 p.m. daily except Tuesday and Wednesday.

Due to state cut backs, tours are given only on Friday, Saturday and Sunday at 10am and 2pm.

External links
Lignumvitae Key Botanical State Park at Florida State Parks
Lignumvitae Key State Botanical Site at Absolutely Florida
Lignumvitae Key State Botanical Site at Wildernet

State parks of Florida
National Natural Landmarks in Florida
Parks in the Florida Keys
National Register of Historic Places in Monroe County, Florida
Protected areas established in 1999
Parks in Monroe County, Florida
Archaeological sites on the National Register of Historic Places in Florida
Historic districts on the National Register of Historic Places in Florida